Titan FC 29: Ricci vs. Sotiropoulos  was a mixed martial arts event, held on August 22, 2014 at the Crown Coliseum in Fayetteville, North Carolina.

Background
Originally this event was supposed to headline by former UFC vets Ben Saunders taking on Matt Riddle for the vacant wetherlegith championship but Riddle pulled out due to injury and was replaced with Jose Landi-Jons. The fight was then called off due to Landi-Jons running into visa issues and Ben Saunders returning to the UFC.

Originally Mike Ricci & George Sotiropoulos were slated to take on one another at Titan FC 28, but Ricci suffered an injury and the bout was called off.

Vinny Magalhães was scheduled to fight Dustin Jacoby but Magalhães suffered a minor injury and was replaced with Lucas Lopes.

Official fight card

See also
Titan Fighting Championships
List of Titan FC events
Titan FC events

References

2014 in mixed martial arts
Mixed martial arts in North Carolina
Sports in North Carolina
2014 in sports in North Carolina
August 2014 sports events in the United States